Artic, styled as ARTIC or ForCity Smart, is an articulated low-floor tram model designed and manufactured by Škoda Transtech Oy in Finland.  Trams of the design are in operation in Finland, Germany and Czechia, with further large orders in these countries. The design was subsequently rebranded under the Škoda ForCity brand.

Helsinki 
In December 2010 the design was included in the winning tender to deliver 40 new trams to the Helsinki City Transport (HKL), the municipal tram operator of Helsinki Regional Transport Authority (HSL), with an option for 90 units more.  The winning bid was worth €113 million, which makes the unit cost of the initial agreement €2.8 million per tram.

The first unit was rolled out in the summer of 2013 and taken to line operation for testing purposes in the autumn of 2013. The second unit was delivered in November 2013, and these two units will be thoroughly tested before the manufacturing of the remaining 38 units will begin in late 2015. All the units will be delivered by 2018.

The technical design is based on free-turning bogies, which was rarely seen in low-floor trams before. The tram network in Helsinki, which has many sharp turns and switches and steep gradients, poses a challenge for many low-floor tram designs, which made the Variotram design ill-suited for the network. To remedy these problems, Helsinki City Transport itself made preliminary design for a new low-floor model, and this design work was also the foundation of the Artic tram. The design claims to move more smoothly and quietly in sharp turns and switches and wear down the tram wheels less.

The tram is equipped with a regenerative braking system. In the Helsinki version the energy is used for heating, but the design is also ready to be equipped with supercapacitors.

By June 2018, HKL has used all three of its options for extra units. First option was used in 2016 for 20 additional units (numbers 441–460) for the existing Helsinki network and they are to be delivered by the end of 2018. Second option was also used in 2016 for 29 additional units (numbers 601–629), but this time for the future Raide-Jokeri light rail (due to start operations in 2024) connecting the cities of Helsinki and Espoo. The first Artic XL tram will be used in the existing Helsinki network for testing and will be delivered around 2019–2020, while the production of the series will begin sometime in the early 2020s. The last option was used in June 2018 for 10 more units (numbers 461–470) of the basic Artic model for the expanding network in the coming years. These vehicles will be delivered by the end of 2019. That makes a total of 99 Artic trams ordered and/or delivered for Helsinki City Transport (HKL).

Tampere 

Bi-directional Artic trams also operate in the city of Tampere in Finland for the Tampere light rail system which opened in 2021. A total of 19 units (with an option for an additional 46 units for future expansions) were delivered during 2020 and 2021 for the city-owned company Tampere Tramway Ltd (Tampereen Raitiotie Oy), which owns, maintains and develops the network and rolling stock. The Artic light rail vehicles for Tampere have a capacity of 264 passengers (64+40 seated, 200 standing, 4 persons/m2).

Heidelberg, Mannheim/Ludwigshafen 
In June 2018 Škoda won a tender for Rhein-Neckar-Verkehr GmbH and will deliver 80 bi-directional Artic trams for use in the large metre-gauge network covering Mannheim/Ludwigshafen and Heidelberg. The contract includes an option for 34 additional vehicles. The contract consists of thirty-one  trams (three modules), thirty-seven  trams (four modules) and twelve  trams (six modules), the longest trams in the world .

Ostrava 

In September 2018 Škoda Transportation signed a contract with the city transport company of Ostrava for 40 two-section Škoda 39 T (also known as Škoda ForCity Smart Ostrava) trams. The first tram was to be delivered in the third quarter of 2020, but due to the COVID-19 pandemic, delivery was postponed to October 2021.

Pilsen 

In October 2018 city transport company of Pilsen ordered 2 three-section bi-directional Škoda 40 T (also known as Škoda ForCity Smart Pilsen) trams with an option for 20 additional vehicles. The total capacity of  tram will be 185 passengers. The trams will be  100% low-floor and fully air-conditioned. The first tram was to be delivered in October 2020, but due to the COVID-19 pandemic, delivery was postponed to July 2021.

Schöneiche 
In October 2018 Škoda Transtech sold the two Artic pre-series trams to the Schöneiche bei Berlin tramway. A further order of one brand new Škoda Artic tram was placed in April 2019.  As such, both the first built and last built Helsinki-style Artic trams operate in Germany on the Schöneiche/Rüdersdorf route.

References

External links

New trams for Helsinki, a site presenting the new model

Tram vehicles of Finland
Gearless electric drive